Plateau Sign Language, or Old Plateau Sign Language, is a poorly attested, extinct sign language historically used across the Columbian Plateau. The Crow Nation introduced Plains Sign Talk, which replaced Plateau Sign Language among the eastern nations that used it (the Coeur d’Alene, Sanpoil, Okanagan, Thompson, Lakes, Shuswap, and Coleville), with western nations shifting instead to Chinook Jargon.

Further reading
 "Sign Language Among North American Indians Compared With That Among Other Peoples And Deaf-Mutes," First Annual Report of the Bureau of Ethnology to the Secretary of the Smithsonian Institution, 1879-1880, Government Printing Office, Washington, 1881, pages 263-552
 Clark, William Philo. 1885. The Indian Sign Language

Non-deaf sign languages
North America Native-based pidgins and creoles
Interlinguistics
First Nations languages in Canada
Sign languages of Canada
Languages extinct in the 18th century
18th-century disestablishments in North America
Extinct languages of North America
Sign languages of the United States
Extinct sign languages